Earl John Witte (December 12, 1906 - November 1, 1991) was an American football player in the National Football League. He played with the Green Bay Packers during the 1934 NFL season.

References

External links

People from St. Peter, Minnesota
Green Bay Packers players
Gustavus Adolphus Golden Gusties football players
1906 births
1991 deaths